The 2018–19 European winter occurred from late 2018 to early 2019. Notable events included the early snows in Spain and intense flooding in Italy, in cities such as Venice, the intense snow storms which affected central Europe in January, the snow storms in Greece over the New Year period, as well as the end of February. As well as severe winter weather, there was also exceptional warmth across western Europe in the last week of February. Unlike previous winters, a developing El Niño was expected to influence weather patterns across Europe, although the effect is not fully known.

Officially, winter 2018–19 began in the Northern Hemisphere on the winter solstice, which in 2018 occurred on 21 December 2018, and ended at the March equinox, which in 2019 occurred on 20 March 2019. Based on the meteorological definition, the first day of winter is 1 December and the last day 28 February.

Forecasts 

Accuweather released its European forecast on 18 October 2018. They highlighted that conditions in North Western Europe and Western Scandinavia would be wet and unsettled, with frequent windstorms in the United Kingdom, Northern France and Western Norway. Similarly, Southeastern Europe was predicted to have occasional storms, with a swathe of warmer than average temperatures covering most of Portugal and Spain, as well as Italy and extending as far east as South Western Ukraine. Most of Eastern Europe, including parts of Scandinavia were predicted to have 'cold shots', this area extended from eastern Sweden down to Ukraine.

The most active part of the storm season was predicted to be from January to February, with such cities as Manchester, UK Belfast, UK and Glasgow, UK at the highest risk of impacts from storms. A cold spell with the severity of that of earlier in 2018, The beast from the east, was not expected. Accuweather predicted that in December, storms would be most frequent in Northern Spain and France. Despite predicting above normal rainfall, they didn't expect extreme flooding which was seen in the winter of 2013–14. Storms were predicted to continue into March and April. Unsettled weather was also predicted to last throughout much of the season for Germany, too. Despite unsettled weather in Northern Europe, lasting warmth was predicted in Southern Europe, with drought not being a concern as a result of early rainfall winter. Cold shots were predicted to reach as far east as Poland and the Czech Republic.

Monthly Timeline

August 
During the final week of August, temperatures started to rapidly decline across Northern, Western and Central Europe, with frosts in the UK and heavy snow in Austria and Germany accompanied by temperatures below freezing.

September 
September 2018 saw the start of the Autumn season in Europe, with the first storms of the 2018–19 European windstorm season, Ex-Hurricane Helene striking western Europe on the 15th and 16th. The first named storm, Ali, affected the UK and Ireland on the 18th. In the Netherlands, De Bilt recorded the country's lowest maximum temperature for 23 September, reaching . This was also the record low for Northern Ireland in September. However, this record was broken at the same location in 2020.

October 
For most parts of the Alps, the first substantial snowfall of the season occurred on the 1st. The snow line was as low as 1400 m.

Storm Adrian was a severe storm that affected Western Europe and Northern Africa from 27 October until 3 November. It brought heavy, flooding rains to Venice, Italy, with officials estimating that 75% of the city was underwater, with depths exceeding for only the 5th time in recorded history.

This was the lowest reading in the UK in October since 1993. This period also saw heavy snowfall across North East England and Southern Scotland, with some places experiencing a 'white halloween' and the coldest day time temperatures in October since the 2008 cold snap. Overall, the UK recorded its coldest October since 2012.

November 
Weather during November was benign, with little noteworthy occurrences. However, there were 3 named storms, Beatriz, Carlos and Diana, which were named by the meteorological agencies of France, Spain and Portugal. Over Scandinavia, there was an unusual lack of snow, especially over Lapland.

December 

The lack of snow that prevailed throughout Scandinavia in November continued into December.
Storm Deirdre affected the United Kingdom on the 15th and brought a rare spell of freezing rain to many areas.

January 
The major snowfalls occurred from 2 to 9 January 2019 across central and southern Europe, killing at least 13 people. Schools in Austria were closed, and people were advised to clear their roofs of snow after several buildings collapsed. Snow also blanketed the Greek capital, Athens for the first time in years and schools were forced to close. An avalanche in Norway, measuring  left 4 people presumed dead. The maximum depth of snow was  Tauplitzalm, Styria, Austria on the 6th
Heavy snow was also reported in Macedonia. The winter storms had over 200 flights cancelled, and some areas of Austria declaring a catastrophe.
At the end of the month, a cold spell set in, in the UK and Ireland, as well as bringing low temperatures, it also brought disruptive snowfall. On the 30th, heavy snow struck North West England overnight (29th–30th), and heavy snow continued to fall until around 11am. The heavy snow forced 214 schools to close as well as both Liverpool and Manchester airports, which closed for 2 hours. In many places in the UK, temperatures plummeted below  over the course of the cold snap with temperatures in all areas well below freezing by day.

February 

There were 4 windstorms named by the French, Spanish and Portuguese meteorological associations. They were Helena, Isaias, Julia and Kyllian.
From mid-month, a spell of exceptionally warm weather began across western Europe, primarily affecting France and the UK. This record was then beaten again on the 24th, with   also at Gogerddan. This was the first time that  had been reached in February in the UK. The 26th then broke the UK wide record again, as well as the English and Welsh records too. During this spell, Northern Ireland was the only UK country not to set a new record, the current record was set in 1998.

March 
During March, there were two named storms, Laura and Gareth.
Storm Gareth, named by the UK Met Office, was more remarkable in terms of rainfall, 137 mm of rain was reported as falling in Capel Curig, Wales in just a few hours. Despite the prolonged drought preceding the heavy rainfall, cities such as York and Ross-on-Wye flooded. Snow was also reported in locations such as Dunblane, Scotland.

April 
The last major snow storm of the season occurred over the United Kingdom on 4 April 2019.

May
Early May brought cold and snow back to many parts of the United Kingdom, France and Germany. With snow falling in places it had never fell in the month of May before. For example, snow was recorded as lying at Côte d’Azur for the first time in May. Germany also saw some snowfall on 4 May, with depths exceeding  in some areas. The snowfall was coupled with unusually low temperatures. Paris had its coldest May in 22 years.

Snow cover and sea ice advancement

Snow cover

The first snow cover of the season was reported on Tuesday 21 August, across eastern parts of Russia. However, this was temporary as by the 23rd, this snow had melted, although a few small patches remained. Snow cover was observed again across parts of Eastern Russia on the 6 and 7 September. This snow did melt in some places however, in a small area of Siberia, this snow cover persisted throughout the month. The first snow cover of the season started to appear in Norway and Sweden on 17 September. On 5 October, snow cover became widespread over northern parts of Finland, Sweden and Norway, as well as far North Eastern Russia and Northern Mongolia. On the 7th, snow cover became widespread across Iceland. By 12 October, snow cover across Northern Parts of Scandinavia had mainly melted, but snow cover across far east and north Russia become much more widespread. By the 17th, snow cover, although patchy, had advanced into central western Russia, with most of Scandinavia snow free again. By the 26th, the first snow cover started to appear of the United Kingdom and more general snow cover over most of Russia and Scandinavia. By 26 November, most of Russia was snow covered as well as Scandinavia. Snow cover extended into Ukraine and Belarus too, with widespread snow cover across the alps. By 16 December, snow covered all of Russia and Scandinavia, as well as most of Eastern Europe and extending into France and the UK.
By 19 February, snow cover started receding across Scandinavia and Eastern Europe. Parts of south eastern Russia start to lose their snow cover on 1 March. By 31 March, snow cover was lost across western parts of Russia. By the end of April, Northern Scandinavia and central-western Russia eastwards still had snow cover. By 29 June, only far Northern parts of Russia still had snow cover left from winter.

Sea ice

The minimum extent of the summer season was reached on 19 September, and again on the 23rd. The sea ice extent dropped to 1.77 million square miles (4.59 million square kilometres), which tied the record for the sixth lowest (with 2008 and 2010). The minimum was reached 5 and 9 days later than the mean date of 14 September. After this, ice began forming much quicker than average. This meant by 30 November, most places had above average ice-cover. Sea ice extent peaked on 13 March, at 5.71 million square miles (14.78 million square kilometres). This was the 7th lowest peak, tying with 2007.

Overview by country

United Kingdom 

In the United Kingdom, winter was much warmer than average, and the warmest since 2015–16. The period of very low rainfall continued into the winter, with most places seeing between 50 and 70% of their average rainfall, with places in South East Scotland seeing less than 30%.

Notes

References 

2018 meteorology
2019 meteorology